A manticore is a mythical creature similar to a chimera.

Manticore can also refer to:
 Manticore Records, a music label
 Manticore (Boogiepop), a character from Boogiepop and Others
 Manticore (2005 film), a Sci Fi Pictures original film
 Manticore (2022 film), a Spanish film
 Manticore, a fictional secret governmental organization in the television series Dark Angel
 Manticore, a character who is part of the Onslaught team in the DC Comics universe
 Manticore, a character from the comic based on the video game City of Heroes
 "Manticore", a song by Ninja Sex Party from their 2011 album NSFW
 Manticore, a bio-weapon developed by Atlas Corporation in the video game Call of Duty: Advanced Warfare
 The Manticore, a novel by Robertson Davies
"The Manticore", a song by Scottish musician Momus from his 2015 album Glyptothek

See also
Manticora (disambiguation)
Maticora
 Mantecore, the name of the white tiger that attacked Roy Horn of the entertainment duo Siegfried & Roy
 Montecore (disambiguation)